The 38th Artios Awards, presented by the Casting Society of America, honoring the best originality, creativity and the contribution of casting to the overall quality of a film, television series, short film, short-form series and theatre production, were held on March 9, 2023, simultaneously at The Beverly Hilton in Los Angeles and Edison Ballroom in New York, being the first time in two years that the ceremony was an in-person event.

The nominations for the television, short-form project, and theatre categories were announced on October 17, 2022. The nominees for the film categories were announced on January 10, 2023.

Yvette Nicole Brown and Amber Ruffin both hosted the event simultaneously. The latter hosted in New York while the former hosted in Los Angeles; Brown previously hosted the first virtual awards ceremony in 2021 and was on hand to emcee the organization's first in-person gala in two years. Simone Bär, who was selected last year to receive the 2023 European Capelier-Shaw Award for Excellence in Casting, died recently and received her award posthumously.

Winners and nominees

Film

Television

Short-Form Projects

Theatre

Honorary awards
 Lynn Stalmaster Award – Rita Moreno
 Hoyt Bowers Award – Leslee Feldman
 Rosalie Joseph Humanitarian Award – Jessica Sherman
 Marion Dougherty New York Apple Award – Black Theatre United

References

Artios Awards
2022 television awards
Artios
2023 awards in the United States
March 2023 events in the United States